Murder in Tarsis is a fantasy novel by John Maddox Roberts, set in the world of the Dragonlance, and based on the Dungeons & Dragons role-playing game. It is the first novel published in the "Mysteries" series in 1996 which was tied to the Forgotten Realms series as it was a first time by TSR of publishing as a theme across multiple game-worlds. In 1999 it was re-published in the Dragonlance The Classics Series.

Plot summary
This novel is about Tarsis, a once proud city by the sea, now landlocked and decaying because of a great catastrophe, with a huge nomad army laying siege to its crumbling walls; and the main character is Ironwood – a mercenary bearing the curse of the dragon he once slew.

Reception
Gordon Kibblewhite reviewed Murder in Tarsis for Arcane magazine, rating it a 3 out of 10 overall. He commented that "This uninspired and ultimately dismissible Forgotten Realms mystery is all the more disappointing because, given better handling and writing, it could have been a memorable fantasy. It certainly possesses enough ingredients for a classic tale". He adds that "As one of the characters points out, Ironwood's story is worthy of an epic poem. Sadly, though, Murder in Tarsis is just a weak murder story that goes the way of many Forgotten Realms efforts, into the arena of cut-out characters, unconvincing scheming and cheesy endings. There may not be anything wrong with that, though - it's a formula that seems to sell well, and there is more than enough information here to create a place around which you can weave your own, hopefully better, webs." Kibblewhite concludes his review by saying, "One of the strongest images of the book is that of the city's decrepit old harbour, where hundreds of ships lie in perpetual dry-dock. Rotting and falling apart, they form a labyrinthine warren that is the home of many a strange creature. This should make a good location for an adventure, so it's a shame that this potentially wondrous place, in the end, fails to live up to its promise and doesn't seem wondrous at all."

References

1996 novels
Dragonlance novels